The Amazing Dobermans (re-titled Lucky for its 1978 re-release) is a 1976 American crime comedy film starring Fred Astaire, James Franciscus and Barbara Eden. It is the second and final sequel in a trilogy of Doberman Gang films that includes The Doberman Gang (1972) and The Daring Dobermans (1973). The film was re-released theatrically in 1978 under the new title Lucky and was re-distributed by Rosamond Productions.

Plot
Lucky Vincent (James Franciscus) is a gambler who, after a stretch of bad luck, owes over $12,000 to mobster Solly Kramer (Jack Carter). Lucky is rescued from Solly's goons by Daniel Hughes (Fred Astaire), a revivalist ex-con and his team of five trained Doberman Pinschers. After going undercover at a circus, Lucky persuades Daniel to work up an act with his dogs and join the carnival; when Lucky discovers that Solly and his gang intend to rob an armored car hauling the circus' box office take, Daniel and his canine friends step forward to help thwart the plot. Along the way, Lucky also finds time to make romance with a beautiful circus performer named Justine Pirot (Barbara Eden).

Cast
Fred Astaire as Daniel Hughes
James Franciscus as Lucky Vincent
Barbara Eden as Justine Pirot
Jack Carter as Solly
Billy Barty as Samson
Charlie Brill as Proy
Parley Baer as Septimus, the circus owner

References

External links

The Amazing Doberman at New York Times

1976 films
1970s crime comedy films
American sequel films
American crime comedy films
American independent films
Films about dogs
Films scored by Alan Silvestri
1976 comedy films
1970s English-language films
1970s American films
1976 independent films
English-language crime comedy films